The 1991–92 YUBA League (also known as 1991–92 YUBA Wiener Broker League for sponsorship reasons) was a transitional season of Yugoslav Basketball League, top level Yugoslav basketball competition, first under newly formed Yugoslav Basketball Association (YUBA), and the last that started in SFR Yugoslavia.

Teams 
YUBA was founded to promote professional basketball in Yugoslavia independent of political situation and when the draw was held in June 1991, following 12 clubs were supposed to contest the league: Pop 84, Partizan, Cibona, Zadar, Vojvodina, IMT,  Smelt Olimpija, Bosna, Crvena Zvezda, Sloboda Dita, Oveco Zagreb and Rabotnički.

Later, due to Yugoslav Wars, all teams from Slovenia and Croatia abandoned the competition and were replaced with new clubs from the Yugoslav 1. B Federal Basketball League. An impromptu entry tournament for four 1.B Federal League teams—KK Prvi partizan Titovo Užice (soon to have its name changed to KK Užice), KK Spartak Subotica, KK Čelik Zenica, and MZT Skopje—was organized during October 1991 in Titograd.

Venues and locations

Regular season

League table

Playoff

Winning roster  
The winning roster of Partizan:
  Igor Perović
  Željko Rebrača
  Zoran Stevanović
  Vladimir Dragutinović
  Dragiša Šarić
  Mlađan Šilobad
  Igor Mihajlovski
  Nikola Lončar
  Aleksandar Đorđević
  Predrag Danilović
  Slaviša Koprivica
  Ivo Nakić

Coach:  Želimir Obradović

See also 
 1991–92 KK Crvena zvezda season
 1991–92 KK Partizan season

References 

Yugoslav First Basketball League seasons
YUBA
YUBA